Eberhard Werner Happel (12 August 1647 in Kirchhain – 15 May 1690 in Hamburg) was  a German author, novelist, journalist and polymath.

Happel wrote fiction and nonfiction. He included many aspects of contemporary knowledge in his many works which therefore had an encyclopaedic form and dealt with historical and current political themes, compilations of anecdotes about famous people past and present, descriptions of exotic regions, and popular treatises on natural science.

Works
Der asiatische Onogambo. 1673
Sogenannter christlicher Potentaten Kriegsroman. 2 volumes, 1681
Der insulanische Mandorell. 1682 
Der ungarische Kriegsroman. 6 volumes, 1685-1697
Der italienische Spinelli oder so genannte Europäische Geschicht-Romans auf das 1685. 4 volumes, 1685–1686
Der spanische Quintana oder so genannte Europäische Geschicht-Roman auf das 1686. 4 volumes, 1686–1687
Der französische Cormantin oder so genannte Europäische Geschicht-Roman auf das 1687. 4 volumes, 1687–1688
Everhardi Guerneri Happelii Mundus Mirabilis Tripartitus, Oder Wunderbare Welt, in einer kurtzen Cosmographia. 3 volumes, 1687–1689
Der ottomanische Bajazet oder so genannte Europäische Geschicht-Roman auf das 1688. 4 volumes, 1688–1689
Afrikanischer Tarnolast. 1689
Der teutsche Carl oder so genannte Europäische Geschicht-Roman auf das 1689. 4 volumes, 1690
Der Academische Roman, worinnen das Studenten-Leben fürgebildet wird. hrsg. G. E. Scholz, Wien 1962 (Repr. d. Ausg. Ulm 1690)

References

1647 births
1690 deaths
People from Kirchhain
German journalists
German male journalists
German male writers